The Texas Bowl is an annual postseason NCAA-sanctioned Division I FBS college football bowl game first held in 2006 in Houston, Texas. Each edition of the bowl has been played at NRG Stadium, previously known as Reliant Stadium. The bowl replaced the defunct Houston Bowl, which was played annually from 2000 to 2005, and before that the Bluebonnet Bowl, the first bowl game in Houston, played from 1959 through 1987.

Since the 2021 edition, the bowl has been sponsored by the tax preparation software company TaxAct and officially known as the TaxAct Texas Bowl.

History

Replacing the Houston Bowl
Speculation surfaced questioning the long-term survival of the former Houston Bowl. The three-year contract with EV1.net expired on December 31, 2005, leaving the bowl game without a title sponsor. A college football official told the Houston Chronicle that the bowl was in danger of ceasing operations, as a result of the game losing its title sponsor and because the Houston Bowl still owed roughly $600,000 to the Big 12 and Mountain West conferences following the 2005 game. However, the NCAA approved Lone Star Sports & Entertainment, a division of the Houston Texans, who also play in Reliant Stadium, to take over game management. In July 2006, the NFL Network acquired TV rights and naming rights to the bowl.

Texas Bowl introduction
The Texas Bowl name and logo were officially unveiled on August 10, 2006, at a press conference along with conference affiliations for the bowl spots. The Big 12, Big East and Conference USA will be affiliated with the game, as well as Texas Christian University of the Mountain West. The 2006 matchup featured teams from the Big 12 and Big East Conferences.

On December 3, 2006, Rutgers accepted an invitation to play Kansas State in the inaugural Texas Bowl. "We're ecstatic about having Rutgers," Texas Bowl director David Brady said. "This is a top-15 team that was three yards away from a BCS game. We couldn't be happier to have them here."

2010 marked the eleventh consecutive year a bowl game has played in Houston, and the 40th year overall with a bowl game there (the Bluebonnet Bowl lasted 29 years). It was also announced on December 30, 2009, that ESPN Events would take over as part owner and operator of the game, while Lone Star Sports and Entertainment will maintain a stake in the bowl, and would be carried on ESPN.

Sponsors
On April 12, 2011, ESPN announced Meineke Car Care signed a three-year title sponsorship deal beginning in 2011, changing name of the bowl to the Meineke Car Care Bowl of Texas.

On February 12, 2014, it was announced that AdvoCare will be the title sponsor for the bowl game.  That sponsorship concluded after the 2016 game.

On November 15, 2017, Academy Sports + Outdoors became the new title sponsor of the bowl. That sponsorship concluded after the 2019 game.

On December 14, 2020, Mercari was announced as the new title sponsor of the game. The 2020 game was later canceled due to COVID-19 issues.

On November 24, 2021, TaxAct was named as the new title sponsor of both the Texas Bowl and the Camellia Bowl.

Conference tie-ins
On May 17, 2007, it was announced Conference USA would have a team in the 2007 Texas Bowl. The Texas Bowl has a rotating commitment with the Big East Conference and Conference USA for 2006–09 while the Big 12 Conference will have a team in all four of those games. In 2007, TCU took the place of the Big 12 team when Kansas and Oklahoma were put into the BCS, and Houston, a "home team," represented C-USA. The conferences would receive $612,500 each as per the rules of the agreements as usually, the Big East (or Big 12) would have received $750,000 for playing and C-USA would have received a $500,000 stipend for their team playing.

Issues
According to Sports Illustrated, in 2008 the bowl required Western Michigan University to purchase 11,000 tickets at full price in order to accept the invitation to play in the bowl. The university was only able to sell 548 tickets at that price, forcing it to accept a $462,535 loss, before travel expenses, to pay for the privilege of playing in the bowl.

The 2020 edition, slated for December 31 between TCU and Arkansas, was cancelled on December 29 due to COVID-19 issues within the TCU program.

Game results
Rankings are based on the AP Poll prior to the game being played.

Source:

MVPs

Source:

Most appearances

Updated through the December 2022 edition (16 games, 32 total appearances).

Teams with multiple appearances

Teams with a single appearance
Won (7): Arkansas, Illinois, Navy, Rice, Rutgers, Syracuse, TCU

Lost (6): Houston, Northwestern, Western Michigan, Oklahoma State, Ole Miss, Vanderbilt

Appearances by conference
Updated through the December 2022 edition (16 games, 32 total appearances).

 Games marked with an asterisk (*) were played in January of the following calendar year.
 Rutgers appeared in 2006 as a member of the Big East; the American Athletic Conference (The American) retains the conference charter following the 2013 split of the original Big East along football lines.
 Independent appearances: Navy (2009)

Game records

Media coverage

The first three editions of the bowl were televised by NFL Network. Since 2009, it has been carried by ESPN.

Notes

References

External links
 

 
College football bowls
Annual events in Texas
Annual sporting events in the United States
Sports competitions in Texas
American football in Houston
Recurring sporting events established in 2006